A Man Named John is a 1965 drama film directed by Ermanno Olmi and starring Rod Steiger.

Plot

The film is a biography of Pope John XXIII, who, however, does not appear in the film as an actual character. Instead Rod Steiger acts as an "intermediary", telling the Pope's life story while traveling through the places in Bergamo where he grew up.

Cast
 Rod Steiger - The Intermediary
 Adolfo Celi - Msgr. Radini Tedeschi
 Giorgo Fortunato - Secretary of Nunzio Roncalli
 Ottone Candiani - The Sinful Priest of Venice
 Alfonso Orlando - Parish priest
 Alberto Rossi - Angelo Roncalli - Age 7
 Giovanni Rossi - Angelo Roncalli - Age 10 (as Giovannio Rossi)
 Fabrisio Rossi - Angelo Roncalli - Age 4
 Pietro Germi - Pontiff's Father
 Rita Bertocchi - Pontiff's Mother
 Antonio Bertocchi - Uncle Xavier
 Antonio Ruttigni - Don Pietro, parish priest of Carviso
 Romolo Valli - The Intermediary (voice)

Critical reception
Stanley Kauffmann of The New Republic described A Man Named John as a 'mistake'.

References

External links

1965 films
Italian drama films
1960s Italian-language films
1965 drama films
Films directed by Ermanno Olmi
Films produced by Harry Saltzman
Pope John XXIII
Cultural depictions of Italian men
1960s Italian films